Tenshinsho Jigen Ryu Hyōhō (天眞正自源流兵法) is a koryu (ancient martial art) specializing in iaijutsu (quick-draw sword art) and kenjutsu (swordsmanship) founded by Tose Yosazaemon Osamune around the Eiroku Era (1558- 1570). The system also teaches Yawara (柔), Naginata (長刀) Sōjutsu (槍術) and Nagamaki (長巻) as part of the curriculum. The current headmaster of the Tenshinsho Jigen Ryu (as of 2019) is the 16th (30th) sōke Takahashi Tamon (髙橋多聞).

History
According to the written scrolls passed down within the successors of the school, Tenshinsho Jigen Ryu traces back its roots to Jigensai Kazutō Jiichibō (自源齋一任自一坊), founder of Hakugen Ryu (白源流) in the 10th century. His techniques were based on Kashima no Tachi Shinmyoken (鹿島之太刀神妙剣), which was created by Kunima Masato (國摩真人) in the early 5thcentury and it is regarded as the first sword school of Japan.

Hakugen Ryu was inherited by the Minamoto clan (源氏), Oide clan, Urabe clan (Priests of Kashima), and finally Yaobettō Kenko (八尾別當顕幸) also known as Yaobettō Kaneyuki, the 14th inheritor. Yaobettō integrated the theories of Hakugen Ryu and Minamoto Ryu (源流) and called it Jiken Ryu (自顕流).

The Tenshisho Jigen Ryu Hyōhō (天眞正自源流兵法) was founded by Tose Yosazaemon Osamune (十瀬 与三左衛門 長宗, c. 1540- c. 1600) around the Eiroku Era (1558-1570). Tose was a land-holding samurai from Hitachi province in Japan. He inherited the scrolls of Jiken ryu from Yaobettō Kenko and, in his twenties, he traveled to Katori Shrine where he came under the instruction of Iizasa Wakasa no Kami Morinobu, the third headmaster of the Tenshin Shoden Katori Shinto Ryu. After five years of training he received a menkyo kaiden (license of mastery). After completing his training in Katori he moved on to continue his studies at Kashima Shrine where he underwent a spiritual ordeal and received, via an oracle, a catalog of martial techniques in a divine inspiration from Takemikazuchi. In addition, he received a vision of technique so swift that with it he could cut a flying swallow out of the air. From this inspiration he named his new system Tenshinsho Jigen Ryu, taking the “Tenshinsho” (true and correct transmission from the deity of Katori Shrine- Futsunushi) from the Tenshin Shoden Katori Shinto Ryu, and adding the term “self-power revelation” (Jigen) which had come to him after his spiritual ordeal at Kashima Shrine. From this point, the version of the lineage described in the school tradition differs from other sources.

In these sources, Tose's student, Kaneko Shinkuro Morisada (金子 新九郎 盛貞, c. 1520- c. 1585), would eventually carry on the tradition by becoming the second headmaster. The third headmaster of the Tenshinsho Jigen Ryu Hyōhō would be Terasaka Yakuro Masatsune (赤坂 弥九郎 政雅, 1567- 1594), also known by his Buddhist dharma name, Zenkitsu (善吉, also read Zenkichi). He was the chief Buddhist priest of the Tennji Temple near Kyoto. Although his life was short lived he did manage to pass on the Tenshinsho Jigen Ryu to Togo Shigekata (東郷 重位, 1560- 1643), a samurai from the Satsuma domain, who after 3 years of having returned to Satsuma synthesized the Tenshinsho Jigen Ryu with the Taisha Ryu to create the Jigen Ryu.

According to tradition, the Tenshinsho Jigen Ryu would remain a well-kept secret in the Satsuma clan through the Jigen Ryu and Yakumaru Jigen Ryu lines, and passed down through a series of dai (a line of headmasters not related by blood) for nearly 400 years.

In 1963, the Tenshisho Jigen Ryu would see a revival under the 27th headmaster, Ueno Yasuyuki Genshin (上野 靖之 源心, 1913- 1972), when he began instructing at the Shobukan in Asakusa, Tokyo until his death in 1972. Ueno would pass on the Tenshinsho Jigen Ryu to his two sons, Ueno Kagenori Genki (上野 景範 源己) and Ueno Takashi Doushin (上野 貴史 童心). They later succeeded Ueno in becoming the 28th and 29th headmasters. Ueno would also instruct Kawabata Terutaka (河端 照孝, b. 1940) who went on to create the Ryushin Shouchi Ryu.

Today, Tenshinsho Jigen Ryu has its headquarters in Saitama Prefecture. It is headed by 29th headmaster, Ueno Takashi Doushin, and Ueno Kagenori, the present headmaster of the school. Ueno Kagenori has conducted several seminars outside Japan, specifically in West Virginia, North Carolina and Florida, U.S.A.

Lineage

Philosophy
The philosophy of Tenshinsho Jigen Ryu is to have pride in the five virtues and to cultivate the spirit of simplicity and fortitude.
These five virtues are represented on the different parts of the Japanese sword.

The spirit of simplicity and fortitude is often represented by a special four character idiom, Shitsu Jitsu Gou Ken (質実剛健), which translates as “Unaffected and sincere, with fortitude and vigor”

References

External links 
 Official Tenshinsho Jigen Ryu Hyohou website
 Official website in German
 Official website in Swedish

Ko-ryū bujutsu
Japanese martial arts
Japanese swordsmanship